The  superyacht Aquarius was launched at the Feadship yard in Aalsmeer. Dutch design company Sinot Exclusive Yacht Design, designed both the interior and exterior of Aquarius.

Design 
The hull is built out of steel while the superstructure is made out of aluminium with teak-laid decks. The yacht is classed by Lloyd's Register and registered in the Cayman Islands. She is powered by twin 3,000 hp MTU 16V 4000 M63L Diesel engines. The vessel's interiors have been conceived by Wynn's own design team.

Amenities 
Aquarius' owner is Steve Wynn, former founder and CEO of Wynn Resorts in Las Vegas. Elevator, swimming pool, beach club, helicopter landing pad, massage room, swimming platform, underwater lights, beauty salon, owner study, tender garage with a  tender, air conditioning, deck jacuzzi, gym, WiFi connection on board.

See also
 List of motor yachts by length
 List of yachts built by Feadship
 Luxury yacht
 Feadship

References

2016 ships
Motor yachts
Ships built in the Netherlands
Steve Wynn